Andreas Lang, better known by the stagename Andy Lee Lang (born Vienna 26 July 1965) is an Austrian rock'n'roll musician. He has performed with Jerry Lee Lewis, Chuck Berry, George Harrison and Fats Domino.

References

1965 births
Living people
Austrian male musicians